Argyroeides tricolor is a moth of the subfamily Arctiinae. It was described by Packard in 1869. It is found in the Amazon basin.

References

Moths described in 1869
Argyroeides
Moths of South America